Carex fritschii is a species of sedge (family Cyperaceae), native to central Europe. Preferring to grow in sandy or gravelly soils in well-lit oak woodlands, its chromosome number is 2n=30.

References

fritschii
Flora of France
Flora of Central Europe
Flora of Italy
Flora of Yugoslavia
Plants described in 1895